Ernest Stanley Wilkinson (born 13 February 1947) is an English retired professional footballer who played in the Football League for Exeter City and Rochdale as a centre half.

Honours 
Nuneaton Borough

 Midland Floodlit Cup: 1970–71

Career statistics

References 

1947 births
Living people
Footballers from Chesterfield
Association football wing halves
English footballers
Rochdale A.F.C. players
Arsenal F.C. players
Exeter City F.C. players
Yeovil Town F.C. players
Rhyl F.C. players
Nuneaton Borough F.C. players
English Football League players
Leamington F.C. players
Poole Town F.C. players
Southern Football League players